Guhan Senthilkumar (born 18 April 1996 in Salem) is an Indian professional squash player. As of March 2018, he was ranked number 225 in the world, which made him the 7th highest internationally ranked Indian squash player. As a junior, he won the 2017 Penang Open. He has competed in the main draw of multiple professional PSA tournaments.

References

1996 births
Living people
Indian male squash players